Dieb13 is the performing name of Dieter Kovačič, a Viennese-based avant-garde musician. He has also performed under the names Takeshi Fumimoto, Echelon, Dieter Bohlen, and dieb14. After appearing on several compilations documenting the burgeoning Viennese avant-garde scene of the late 1990s, he released his first solo album in 2000. He has gone on to perform in a number of collaborations with other notable performers, including Burkhard Stangl, erikm, Mats Gustafsson and the John Butcher Group.

Discography

Solo works
Contemplations On The Congnitive Loudness Of The 4th Reich'n'Roll, 10" hand-cut vinyl (GOD 2019)
trick17 12" colored vinyl (Corvo 2013)
t-series, 13 hand-cut LPs (2013)
u-series 2008, a series of unique 7" vinyl flexi-disks (2008)
Dieb13 vs. Takeshi Fumimoto, 12" vinyl picture disc (Mego, June 2005)
Restructuring (Charhizma, 2000)

Collaborations
Jardin Des Bruits - with Burkhard Stangl (Mikroton 2019)
Scuba - with Angélica Castelló, Billy Roisz and Burkhard Stangl, (Mikroton, 2014)
(fake) the facts - with Martin Siewert and Mats Gustafsson (editions mego 2011)
Jazz på Svenska - with Swedish azz (Not Two, 2010)
Somethingtobesaid - with John Butcher Group (2009)
(c)haos (ɔ)lub - with erikM (Erstwhile, 2007)
Condenser - with Tomas Korber and erikM (Absurd, 2005)
Zirkadia - with Tomas Korber and Jason Kahn (1.8 Sec Records, 2005)
Eh - with Burkhard Stangl (Erstwhile, 2002)
Streaming - with Günter Müller and Jason Kahn (For4ears, 2002)
just in case you are bored. so are we. - with Martin Siewert and Pure (Doc, 2002)
grain - with efzeg (durian 2000)

Compilations
Klingt.org: 10 Jahre Bessere Farben, 2CDs (Mikroton, 2009)
Turntable Solos (Amoebic 1999)

References

External links
 Official Website

1973 births
Living people
Austrian male musicians
Electroacoustic improvisation